Robert G. Margett (born May 8, 1929) was a California state senator until 2008. He represented the 29th Senate District, which includes parts of Los Angeles, Orange and San Bernardino counties. He is a Republican and served on the Budget and Fiscal Review Committee, Government Organization Committee, Natural Resources and Water Committee, Public Safety Committee and Transportation and Housing Committee.

Formerly a mayor in Arcadia, California, he was first elected to the State Senate in 2000 and was re-elected to represent the 29th Senate District in November 2004. Previously he sat in the State Assembly, representing the 59th District, from 1995 to 2000.

References

External links
Join California Bob Margett

1929 births
Republican Party California state senators
Living people
Republican Party members of the California State Assembly
People from Arcadia, California
Mayors of places in California
21st-century American politicians